Highland School is an independent school located in Warrenton, Virginia. Highland was founded in 1928 by Dorothy Rust and Lavinia Hamilton as the Warrenton Branch of the Calvert School of Baltimore.  It was renamed Highland School in 1957 and moved to its current location. As stated in its mission, "Highland School prepares students to thrive, lead and serve in a diverse and dynamic world, developing essential skills and character by challenging them with a demanding academic and co-curricular program." Its upper (high) school was established in 1996. It serves 509 students from twelve counties.

Academics
Highland School offers a lower school (Pre-K2/3 through Grade 4), middle school (Grades 5-8) and upper school (Grades 9-12). The current head of school is Henry D. Berg and was appointed so in 2005. It participates within the Delaney Athletic Conference and the Melville Church Athletic Conference, a group of exclusive private schools in northern and central Virginia, as well as Maryland, and is in the Virginia Independent Schools Athletic Association.

A Humanities and Instructional Technology wing for the Upper School was completed during the fall 2009. A new turf stadium, softball field, and outdoor courtyard were also completed in 2009. In the fall of 2010, construction was completed on the William A. Hazel Family Lower School, new library, expanded spaces for grades PK-4, and LEED Green certification expanded not only the physical structure of the school but also opportunities for Lower School learning. A Middle School renovation was completed for Fall 2012, with the renovation of the Arundel Gymnasium as well as the addition of the Johnson Academic Media Center.

Advanced Placement courses are offered to Upper School students, beginning in their sophomore year. The AP classes offered include Music Theory, 3 different History AP's, 4 science AP's, 3 AP English Classes, 3 AP Math classes and various others.

The maximum class size allowed is 18 students and a number of classes offered have less than ten students.

Sports
Highland offers boys and girls soccer, cross country, golf, boys and girls lacrosse, softball, girls and boys tennis, and swim teams. Highland also fields teams in baseball, basketball, field hockey, dance, volleyball, and cheerleading.  Many teams have had DAC Tournament appearances and championships.

State champion teams 

2002: boys' soccer
2006: girls' soccer
2007: girls' soccer
2007: Softball
2008: Softball
2008: boys' soccer
2009: boys' lacrosse
2009: Golf
2010: boys' soccer
2013: boys' lacrosse
2014: boys' tennis
2015: boys' soccer
2016: girls' lacrosse
2016: girls' soccer
2016: boys' soccer
2017: girls' lacrosse
2018: girls' soccer
2018: girls' lacrosse
2019: girls' basketball
2021: girls' soccer
2022: girls' soccer

References

External links 
 Official website

Educational institutions established in 1928
Private K-12 schools in Virginia
Schools in Fauquier County, Virginia
1928 establishments in Virginia